The 2015 Formula Masters China season is the fifth season of the Formula Pilota China series, and the third under the Formula Masters China branding. The championship began on 18 April at Sepang in Malaysia and will finish on 18 October at Shanghai in China after eighteen races held at six meetings.

Teams and drivers

Race calendar and results
A provisional race calendar was released on 15 December 2014. An updated race calendar was released on 29 January 2015. On 29 March, it was announced that the round due to be held at Sentul in Indonesia, had been removed from the calendar.

Championship standings

Drivers' championship
 Points for both championships were awarded as follows:

Teams' championship

References

External links

Formula Masters China seasons
Formula Masters China season
Formula Masters China season
Masters China